Cooper House, Cooper Farmhouse, or Cooper Farm may refer to

in the United States
(by state then city)

 Davis C. Cooper House, Oxford, Alabama, listed on the National Register of Historic Places (NRHP) in Calhoun County
 Cooper House, Santa Cruz, California, 1894, former courthouse within the former Pacific Avenue Historic District, demolished after the 1989 Loma Prieta earthquake
 Cooper House (Kenton, Delaware), NRHP-listed in Kent County
Cooper House (Duke University)
House at 3609 Via de la Reina, Jacksonville, Florida, also known as the Cooper House, NRHP-listed
 Bartlett Cooper House, Honolulu, Hawaii, listed on the NRHP in Hawaii
 Cooper-Alley House, Waldron, Indiana, listed on the NRHP in Indiana
 George Cooper House, Maquoketa, Iowa, listed on the NRHP in Iowa
 George and Margaret Cooper House, Mount Pleasant, Iowa, listed on the NRHP in Iowa
 Cooper Hall, Sterling, Kansas, listed on the NRHP in Kansas
 Cooper House (Midway, Kentucky), listed on the NRHP in Kentucky
 Judge John E. Cooper House, West Liberty, Kentucky, listed on the NRHP in Kentucky
Perry-Cooper House, Salisbury, Maryland, NRHP-listed
 Cooper-Frost-Austin House, Cambridge, Massachusetts, NRHP-listed
 Cooper-Davenport Tavern Wing, Somerville, Massachusetts, NRHP-listed
 Tunis R. Cooper House, Bergenfield, New Jersey, NRHP-listed
 Pearson-How, Cooper, and Lawrence Houses, Burlington, New Jersey, listed on the NRHP in New Jersey
 Joseph Cooper House, Camden, New Jersey, NRHP-listed
 General Nathan Cooper Mansion, Chester Township, New Jersey, listed on the NRHP in New Jersey
 Benjamin Cooper Farm, Moorestown, New Jersey, listed on the NRHP in New Jersey
 Thunise & Richard Cooper House, Oradell, New Jersey, NRHP-listed
 Evans-Cooper House, Pine Grove, New Jersey, listed on the NRHP in New Jersey
MacGregor-Tallman House, West Long Branch, New Jersey, also known as Cooper House, listed on the NRHP in Monmouth County, New Jersey
 A. S. Cooper Farm, Brownwood, North Carolina, listed on the NRHP in North Carolina
 Robert Lafayette Cooper House, Murphey, North Carolina, NRHP-listed
 Katherine Cooper House, Dover, Ohio, listed on the NRHP in Ohio
 Samuel Cooper Farmhouse, Radnor, Ohio, listed on the NRHP in Ohio
 James S. and Jennie M. Cooper House, Independence, Oregon, listed on the NRHP in Oregon
 Isaac Cooper House, Limestone, Tennessee, listed on the NRHP in Tennessee
 Gov. Prentice Cooper House, Shelbyville, Tennessee, listed on the NRHP in Tennessee
 Jesse and Sara Cooper House, Georgetown, Texas, listed on the NRHP in Texas
 Taylor-Cooper House, Georgetown, Texas, listed on the NRHP in Williamson County, Texas
 Madison Cooper House, Waco, Texas, listed on the NRHP in Texas
 Henry Cooper House, Parkersburg, West Virginia, NRHP-listed
 Cooper-Gillies House, Evansville, Wisconsin, listed on the NRHP in Wisconsin
 Cooper Mansion (Laramie, Wyoming), Laramie, Wyoming, listed on the NRHP in Albany County, Wyoming

See also
Cooper Hall, Rice County, Kansas
Cooper Union, New York City